Monti is an Italian surname. Notable people with the surname include:

Carlo Monti (1920–2016), Italian athlete
Bruno Monti (1930–2011), Italian cyclist
Eleonora Monti (1727 – after 1760), Italian painter
Eugenio Monti (1928–2003), Italian bobsledder
Francesco Monti (Bologna) (1683–1768), Italian painter
Francesco Monti (il Brescianino) (1646–1712), Italian painter
Gaetano Monti (composer), Italian composer
Gaetano Monti, Italian sculptor
Gaetano Matteo Monti, Italian sculptor
Giovanni Battista Monti, Italian painter
Jared C. Monti, American soldier
Katherine Monti, American statistician
Luis Monti, Argentine-Italian footballer
Mario Monti, former Prime Minister of Italy
Martin James Monti (1921–2000), U.S. Army Air Forces pilot, defector and Axis propagandist
Michele Monti (1970–2018), Italian judoka
Peter Monti, American psychologist
Raffaele Monti (born 1981), Italian film director
Rafaelle Monti (sculptor) (1818–1881), Italian sculptor
Urbano Monti (1544–1613), Italian cartographer.
Vincenzo Monti, Italian neoclassical poet and scholar
Vittorio Monti, Italian composer

See also
Monte (name), given name and surname
Monti (given name)
Montie, given name and surname
Monty, given name and surname

Italian-language surnames
Italian toponymic surnames